Type may refer to:

Science and technology

Computing
 Typing, producing text via a keyboard, typewriter, etc.
 Data type, collection of values used for computations.
 File type
 TYPE (DOS command), a command to display contents of a file.
 Type (Unix), a command in POSIX shells that gives information about commands.
 Type safety, the extent to which a programming language discourages or prevents type errors.
 Type system, defines a programming language's response to data types.

Mathematics
 Type (model theory)
 Type theory, basis for the study of type systems
 Arity or type, the number of operands a function takes
 Type, any proposition or set in the intuitionistic type theory
 Type, of an entire function
 Exponential type

Biology
 Type (biology), which fixes a scientific name to a taxon
 Dog type, categorization by use or function of domestic dogs

Lettering

 Type is a design concept for lettering used in typography which helped bring about modern textual printing in the publishing industry
 Type can refer to a font style, e.g., "italic type"
 Movable type, in letterpress printing
 Sort (typesetting), in letterpress printing
 Typesetting, the composition of text by means of arranging types
 Typeface, the overall design of lettering used in a collection of related fonts
 Type design, the art and process of designing typefaces
 Type foundry, a company that designs or distributes typefaces
 Typewriter, a mechanical or electromechanical machine for writing characters similar to those produced by a printer's movable type

Sociology
 Ideal type
 Normal type
 Typification

Other uses
 Type (acting), a way of characterizing an actor by the sort of role they are well-suited for or fit into easily, or by their performance style
 Type & antitype, in Typology, in Christian theology and Biblical exegesis
 "Type" (song), a 1990 song by the band Living Colour
 Type (designation), a model numbering system used for vehicles or military equipment
 Type Museum, museum about the above
 Architectural type, classification of architecture by functional types (houses, institutions), morphological types or historical types Architectural style subcategories
 U.S. Navy type commands, senior commands for the specific "type" of weapon system (i.e., naval aviation, submarine warfare, surface warships) employed
 Type of Constans, a 648 edict issued by Byzantine Emperor Constans II
 Type (metaphysics), in philosophy
 Type-token distinction, in logic, linguistics, and computer programming

See also
 Typology (disambiguation), the study of types
 Categorization
 Kind (disambiguation)